This is a list of museums and galleries in Germany.

Baden-Württemberg

Bavaria

Augsburg
 Augsburg Puppet Theater museum
 Augsburg Railway Park
 Fuggerei museum
 German Ice Hockey Hall of Fame

Bayreuth
 Kunstmuseum Bayreuth

Eichstätt
 Jura Museum

Feucht
 Hermann Oberth Space Travel Museum

Kempten
 Alpin-Museum, largest museum in Europe of the history of the Alpes

Munich
Art museums
 Alte Pinakothek
 Bavarian National Museum
 Bavarian State Archaeological Collection
 Bavarian State Painting Collections
 Glyptothek
 Goetz Collection
 Haus der Kunst
 Lenbachhaus
 Munich Residenz
 Munich Stadtmuseum
 Museum Brandhorst
 Neue Pinakothek
 Pinakothek der Moderne
 Schackgalerie
 Staatliche Antikensammlungen
 Staatliche Sammlung für Ägyptische Kunst
 Museum Five Continents

Cultural history museums
 Marstallmuseum
 Deutsches Brauereimuseum
 Deutsches Jagd- und Fischereimuseum
 Jewish Museum Munich
 Valentin-Museum in the Isartor

Natural history museums
 Museum of Man and Nature
 Paläontologisches Museum München
 Zoologische Staatssammlung München
 Museum Witt

Technology museums
 BMW Museum
 Deutsches Museum

Neuenmarkt
 German Steam Locomotive Museum

Nuremberg

Art museums
 Albrecht-Dürer-Haus (Albrecht Dürer's House)
 Kunsthalle Nürnberg (Gallery of Contemporary Art)
 Kunsthaus im KunstKulturQuartier (Art house at the art and culture area)
 Kunstvilla im KunstKulturQuartier (Art villa at the art and culture area)
 Neues Museum Nürnberg (Museum for Contemporary Art)

History and culture museums
 Dokumentationszentrum Reichsparteitagsgelände (Nazi Party Rally Grounds Documentation Center)
 Germanisches Nationalmuseum (German National Museum)
 Historischer Kunstbunker (World War II Art Bunker)
 Mittelalterliche Lochgefägnisse (Medieval Dungeons Nuremberg)
 Memorium Nürnberger Prozesse (Memorium Nuremberg Trials)
 Museum Tuscherschloss und Hirsvogelsaal (Museum Tucher Mansion and Hirsvogel Hall)
 Spielzeugmuseum Nürnberg (Nuremberg Toy Museum)
 Stadtmuseum Fembohaus (City Museum at Fembo House)

Science and nature museums
 DB-Museum (DB Railway Museum)
 Deutsches Museum Nürnberg (Future Museum)
 Museum Industriekultur (Museum of Industrial Culture)
 Museum für Kommunikation (Museum of Communications)
 Naturhistorisches Museum Nürnberg (Natural History Museum Nuremberg)
 Turm der Sinne (Tower of the Senses)

Regensburg
 Haus der Bayerischen Geschichte: Museum

Solnhofen
 Bürgermeister-Müller-Museum

Würzburg
 Museum im Kulturspeicher Würzburg
 Würzburg Residence

Berlin

Brandenburg

Potsdam
 Museum Barberini
 Sanssouci
 Sanssouci Picture Gallery

Bremen
 Gerhard Marcks House
 Kunsthalle Bremen
 Paula Modersohn-Becker Museum
 Übersee Museum Bremen
 Universum Science Center
 Weserburg (modern art)
 Wilhelm Wagenfeld House (design exhibitions)

Bremerhaven
 Deutsches Schiffahrtsmuseum
German Emigration Center

Hamburg

Hesse

Darmstadt
 Hessisches Landesmuseum

Frankfurt

 Caricatura Museum Frankfurt
 Frankfurter Kunstverein
 German Architecture Museum
 Goethe House
 Historic Railway, Frankfurt
 Historical Museum, Frankfurt
 Jewish Museum Frankfurt
 Liebieghaus
 Museum Angewandte Kunst
 Museum Giersch
 Museum für Kommunikation
 Museum für Moderne Kunst
 Museum der Weltkulturen
 Naturmuseum Senckenberg
 Schirn Kunsthalle Frankfurt
 Städel

Gießen
 Mathematikum

Kassel
 Fridericianum
 Schloss Wilhelmshöhe
 Neue Gallerie
 Palais Bellevue
 Hessisches Landesmuseum
 Astronomisch-Physikalisches Kabinett
 Grimmwelt
 Naturkundemuseum
 Stadtmuseum
 Spohr Museum
 Straßenbahn Museum
 Museum für Sepulkralkultur
 Deutsches Tapetenmuseum
 documenta-Halle
 Caricatura Kassel

Offenbach

 German Leather Museum
 Klingspor Museum

Wiesbaden
 Museum Wiesbaden

Lower Saxony

Braunschweig
 Dankwarderode Castle (Burg Dankwarderode; history)
 Gerstäcker-Museum (about Friedrich Gerstäcker, 1816-1872, traveler and novelist)
 Herzog Anton Ulrich Museum (paintings)
 Braunschweigisches Landesmuseum (history)
 Naturhistorisches Museum (zoology)
 Städtisches Museum (city history)

Einbeck
 PS Speicher

Hanover
 Hannoversches Straßenbahn Museum
 Historisches Museum Hannover
 kestnergesellschaft
 Kestner-Museum
 Landesmuseum Hannover
 Sprengel Museum
 Wilhelm Busch Museum

Hildesheim
 Roemer-und-Pelizaeus-Museum
 Dommuseum Hildesheim

Meppen
 Exhibition Centre for the Archaeology of the Emsland

Osnabrück
 Felix Nussbaum Haus

Wolfsburg
 Phaeno Science Center

Mecklenburg-Western Pomerania

Anklam
 Otto-Lilienthal-Museum

Greifswald
 Botanical Museum Greifswald
 Pomeranian State Museum

Neubrandenburg
 Neubrandenburg Regional Museum

Rostock
Abbey of the Holy Cross, Rostock
Frieden (museum ship)
Gelbensande Hunting Lodge
Rostock Art Gallery
Zoological Collection Rostock

Rügen
Granitz Hunting Lodge
Mönchgut Coastal Fishing Museum
Rügen Railway & Technology Museum

Schwerin
Schwerin Palace
Staatliches Museum Schwerin
State Museum of Technology

Stralsund
Stralsund Museum of Cultural History
German Oceanographic Museum
Ozeaneum

Waren (Müritz)
Müritzeum

Others
Darßer Ort Natureum
Groß Raden Archaeological Open Air Museum
Kranich Museum
Ludwigslust Palace
Malchow Abbey
Otto Lilienthal Museum Anklam
Peenemünde Historical-Technical Museum
Ukranenland

North Rhine-Westphalia

Aachen
 Ludwig Forum für Internationale Kunst

Bielefeld
 Kunsthalle Bielefeld

Bochum
 Bochum Dahlhausen Railway Museum
 German Mining Museum

Bonn
 Beethoven House
 Bonn Women's Museum
 Haus der Geschichte
 Kunst- und Ausstellungshalle der Bundesrepublik Deutschland
 Kunstmuseum Bonn
 Museum Koenig
 Rheinisches Landesmuseum Bonn

Cologne

Art museums
 Käthe Kollwitz Museum 
 Kolumba, art museum of the Archdiocese of Cologne
 Museum of Applied Art
 Museum Ludwig 
 Skulpturen Park Köln
 Wallraf-Richartz Museum

History and culture museums
 EL-DE Haus
 Fragrance Museum
 Imhoff-Schokoladenmuseum
 Romano-Germanic Museum 
 Schnütgen Museum

Dortmund
 German Football Museum
 Museum für Kunst und Kulturgeschichte
 Museum Ostwall

Duisburg
 German Inland Waterways Museum
 Lehmbruck Museum
 Museum Küppersmühle

Düsseldorf
 Forum NRW
 Alte Kunsthalle
 Kunsthalle Düsseldorf
 Kunst im Tunnel
 Kunstsammlung Nordrhein-Westfalen
 Museum Kunst Palast

Essen
 Museum Folkwang

Hagen
 Hagen Open-air Museum
 Osthaus-Museum Hagen

Mettmann
 Neanderthal Museum

Mönchengladbach
 Abteiberg Museum

Münster
 Westfälisches Museum für Naturkunde
 Westphalian State Museum of Art and Cultural History

Nideggen 
 Castle Museum

Oberhausen
 LVR Industrial Museum

Viersen
 Städtische Galerie im Park Viersen

Wuppertal
 Bergische Museumsbahnen
 Knipex Museum
 Von der Heydt Museum

Rhineland-Palatinate

Fell
 Fell Exhibition Slate Mine

Freinsheim
 Historic Toy Museum, Freinsheim

Konz
 Roscheider Hof Open Air Museum

Mainz
 Gutenberg Museum
 Landesmuseum Mainz
 Museum of Ancient Seafaring
 Romano-Germanic Central Museum (Mainz)

Speyer
 Technikmuseum Speyer

Trier
 Rheinisches Landesmuseum Trier

Saarland

Saarbrücken
 Saarland Museum

Völklingen
 Völklingen Ironworks

Saxony

Chemnitz
 Gunzenhauser Museum
 Staatliches Museum für Archäologie Chemnitz

Dresden
 Dresden City Museum
 Dresden Transport Museum
 German Hygiene Museum
 Militärhistorisches Museum der Bundeswehr
 Staatliche Kunstsammlungen Dresden, including:
 Dresden Armory
 Dresden Museum of Ethnology
 Dresden Porcelain Collection
 Galerie Neue Meister
 Gemäldegalerie Alte Meister
 Grünes Gewölbe (Green Vault)
 Kupferstich-Kabinett
 Mathematisch-Physikalischer Salon
 State Museum of Zoology, Dresden

Leipzig
 Grassi Museum, including:
 Leipzig Museum of Applied Arts
 Leipzig Museum of Ethnography
 Museum of Musical Instruments of the University of Leipzig
 Museum of Antiquities of the University of Leipzig
 Museum der bildenden Künste
 Naturkundemuseum Leipzig

Others
Frohnauer Hammer
Ore Mountain Toy Museum, Seiffen
Embroidery Machine Museum, Plauen

Saxony-Anhalt

Halle/Saale
Hallors and Saline Museum
Halle State Museum of Prehistory

Others
Jerichow Monastery
Lutherhaus
Wernigerode Castle

Schleswig-Holstein

Kiel
 Zoological Museum of Kiel University

Lübeck
Lübeck Museum of Theatre Puppets
St. Anne's Museum Quarter, Lübeck

Others
 Hedeby Viking Museum

Thuringia

Eichsfeld
 Borderland Museum Eichsfeld

Eisenach
 Bach House (Eisenach)
 Lutherhaus Eisenach
 Wartburg

Erfurt
 Margaretha Reichardt Haus
 Memorial and Education Centre Andreasstrasse
 Naturkundemuseum Erfurt
 Old Synagogue, Erfurt
 Memorial site Topf & Söhne

Gera
 Otto Dix Haus

Jena
 Optical Museum Jena

Weimar
 Bauhaus Museum, Weimar

See also
 List of museums
 List of railway museums in Germany

External links

 German Museums with English Websites

References

 
Museums